The Blohm & Voss BV 143 was an early prototype rocket-assisted glide bomb developed by the German Luftwaffe during World War II.

Design
Blohm & Voss designers began to consider airborne missiles late in 1938, even before the outbreak of war. First of these to be developed was the Bv 143, a glide bomb with rocket booster. Trials began in 1939.

By 1941, Allied merchant ships were slow and easy targets for German coastal bombers, but were proving increasingly well-equipped with anti-aircraft artillery, making short-range attacks prohibitively costly. Interest was raised in the development of a stand off weapon to engage unarmored merchant ships from beyond the range of the Bofors 40 mm gun. The BV 143 was one of several stand off bomb and missile designs researched by the Blohm & Voss Naval Engineering Works for this anti-shipping role.

The first design, with straight wings and cross-like tail, featured a 2-meter instrumented "feeler probe" suspended from the body, designed to start the rocket on contacting the sea surface. A pitch-only autopilot then maintained the bomb at the 2 m probe length until striking the target. The first working prototypes of this design were completed in February 1941. Tests during 1943 showed the probe-based design to be unworkable and after additional design time it was replaced with a radio altimeter, which although being less fragile also ultimately proved unsatisfactory.

The bomb proved consistently unable to reliably maintain altitude stability with either design, with rocket misfires and failures also proving troublesome. After building and testing 157 examples, the project was eventually abandoned in favor of the Henschel Hs 293.

Ship-to-ship variant
BV 143 B (Schiff-Schiff-Lenkflugkörper) was a late ship-to-ship variant of the BV 143 package. It was designed to launch the missile with an aircraft catapult. Only one test was ever conducted before the program was abandoned.

See also
 Blohm & Voss BV 246 Hagelkorn
 Blohm & Voss BV 950
Henschel Hs 293
Glide bomb
Anti-shipping missile
Stand-off missile

References

World War II guided missiles of Germany
Guided bombs
Anti-ship missiles of Germany
BV 143